Daniel Lowther (born 19 April 1977) is the coach of the Geelong AFLW team, and is a former Australian rules footballer who played with Geelong in the Australian Football League (AFL).

Lowther was originally from Diamond Creek, but drafted out of the Northern Knights. Geelong selected him with pick 61 in the 1995 National Draft.

Playing career 

Lowther made his debut for Geelong in 1997, before making 30 of his 34 league appearances in 1998 and 1999.
He was delisted by Geelong after not making a senior team appearance in the 2000 AFL season, but was redrafted again by Geelong with pick 71 in the 2000 AFL Draft, making his final appearance in 2001. 

Delisted again, Lowther joined West Adelaide in the SANFL in 2002, later returning to play local football in the Geelong region for Bell Park and Portarlington.

Coaching career 

Lowther joined Geelong as an assistant coach to the VFL team (Geelong Reserves) in 2015, then in 2018 joined the AFL team as an analyst. In 2020 he joined the Geelong AFLW coaching team as an assistant coach, looking after the midfield.

On 29 June 2021, Lowther was promoted to be the head coach of the Geelong AFLW team, replacing Paul Hood.

References

External links
 
 

1977 births
Australian rules footballers from Victoria (Australia)
Geelong Football Club players
Northern Knights players
Diamond Creek Football Club players
AFL Women's coaches
Living people